Karl Leiter (1890-1957) was an Austrian screenwriter and film director.

Selected filmography
 Queen Draga (1920)
 Pratermizzi (1927)
 Father Radetzky (1929)
 The Missing Wife (1929)
 Das Ferienkind (1943)
 Ich bitte um Vollmacht (1944)
 Emperor's Ball (1956)
 Wiener Luft (1958)

References

External links

1890 births
1957 deaths
Film people from Vienna